= Priest in charge =

Priest in charge of a parish who is not its incumbent

A priest in charge or priest-in-charge (previously also curate-in-charge) in the Church of England is a priest in charge of a parish who is not its incumbent; they will normally work on a short-term contract and have less freedom to act within the parish. Such priests are not legally responsible for the churches and glebe, but simply hold a licence rather than the freehold and are not appointed by advowson.

Under the legislation of the Church of England, the process for a bishop to remove a priest-in-charge is relatively straightforward. As a result, the appointment of priests in charge rather than incumbents (one who does receive the temporalities of an incumbent) is sometimes done when parish reorganisation is taking place or to give the bishop greater control over the deployment of clergy.

Legally, priests in charge are temporary curates, as they have only spiritual responsibilities. Even though they lead the ministry in their parishes, their legal status is little different from assistant curates. However, the term priest in charge has come to be used because the term curate often refers to an assistant curate, who is usually a priest recently ordained who is not in charge of a parish — although it is quite possible for a priest previously beneficed to return to a curacy, sometimes as a matter of choice. The stipend of a priest in charge is often the equivalent to that of an incumbent, and so they are sometimes referred to as having incumbent status.

Incumbents include vicars and rectors.

In the Church of Ireland, priests in charge are referred to as bishop's curates.

== See also ==
- Church of England § Structure
